Music from the Film Hey Badfinger is the sixth album by guitarist and composer Roy Montgomery, released on 24 December 2012 through Yellow Electric.

Track listing

Personnel 
Roy Montgomery – guitar

References 

2012 albums
Roy Montgomery albums